Koh Gabriel Kameda (Japanese: 亀田 光; born January 14, 1975) is a German and Japanese concert violinist and violin teacher.

Early life 
Koh Gabriel Kameda was born in Freiburg im Breisgau, Germany, the son of a German woman, Margarita and a Japanese father. He began playing the violin at the age of five and started participating in competitions from the age of eight, winning mostly first prizes. Shortly after that, he was taken under the wing of Josef Rissin in Karlsruhe.

Career 
Kameda, who was the first prize winner of the Henryk Szeryng International Violin Competition in Mexico in 1997, enjoyed great recognition by both international audiences and colleagues. After hearing him play, Yehudi Menuhin stated enthusiastically that he “was extremely impressed” with Kameda's performance and Sir James Galway proclaimed that “he is one of the most remarkable players of his generation”.

At the age of twelve, Kameda enrolled in the University of Music in Karlsruhe, Germany, and was mentored by professor Josef Rissin. In 1993 violinist and conductor Pinchas Zukerman invited him to come to New York and work with him at the Manhattan School of Music.

Kameda received numerous prizes from national and international competitions. He won first prize at the National German Competition for young musicians, first prize at the International Violin Competition Kloster Schöntal, and first prize at the International Violin Competition “Henryk Szeryng”. In addition to that, he was also a prizewinner at the Eurovision Contest in Vienna, which was broadcast live on TV throughout Europe.

During his career Kameda has received various awards, including the Music Award of the European Industry, the Jürgen-Ponto Foundation award, the Deutsche Stiftung Musikleben award, the Baden-Württemberg Art Foundation award, a scholarship from the international Richard Wagner Society, the Dora Zaslavsky-Koch Scholarship Award and others.

Kameda debuted in 1988 at the age of thirteen in Baden-Baden, Germany, performing the Violin Concerto no.5 by Henri Vieuxtemps with the Baden-Baden Philharmonic Orchestra. Since then he has performed all throughout Europe, Asia, as well as in North and South America. He has appeared as a soloist with leading orchestras around the world including the Staatskapelle Dresden, Berliner Symphoniker, Hamburger Symphoniker, Israel Philharmonic Orchestra, Japan Philharmonic Orchestra, Athens State Orchestra, and Mexico City Philharmonic Orchestra among many others.

An outstanding moment in Kameda's early career was the collaboration with the late Witold Lutoslawski in 1993, in a series of concerts, a year before the death of the Polish composer. He performed “Chain II” under the baton of the composer himself, and from those concerts the last live CD of the composer was produced, receiving acclaim by the press: “outstanding”, according to Neue Musik Zeitung; “superb technique and expressive maturity”, wrote Frankfurter Allgemeine Zeitung.

Time in Japan 
Kameda has received praise for his extensive artistic activities in Japan, where he has become a figure in the classical music scene. In 2000 he performed at the Suntory Hall five times, and each time the tickets were sold out completely. Ten years earlier in 1990, he made his stage debut in Japan performing various violin concertos during the same concert in Tokyo (Suntory Hall) and Osaka (The Symphony Hall). However, his career in Japan did not commence with these concerts, but rather on the primetime TV documentary program “NHK special: Einstein Roman” by the Japan Broadcasting Corporation NHK. He worked together with author Michael Ende and fashion designer Hanae Mori, starring in the lead role and recording the soundtrack. At the same time he recorded a laser disc of the program, the first classical music laser disc produced in Japan.

His ongoing project, “Music Heals”, a series of concerts in hospitals where for many years Kameda has been actively volunteering to bring music to patients, was featured by TV Tokyo in a 60-minute television documentary broadcast in 1999.

In April 2002, Kameda performed at the Violin Concerto by Louis Gruenberg in Japan, with the New Japan Philharmonic under the direction of Gerard Schwarz. This work was commissioned by Jascha Heifetz in 1945. After Jascha Heifetz had performed and recorded the concerto with the San Francisco Symphony Orchestra under Pierre Monteux it has not been presented by anyone until Kameda played it as the first violinist besides Heifetz. Gruenberg's daughter, Joan commented on Kameda's performance “I was delighted to discover your brilliant performance of my father's violin concerto. You have perfected this difficult piece and played it beautifully.” German journalist and author Harald Eggebrecht also reviewed Kameda's performance of the Gruenberg concerto in his book "Große Geiger. Kreisler, Heifetz, Oistrach, Mutter, Hahn und Co".

Reviews 
A review in the German Scala magazine stated: Kameda “sounds like Heifetz”, and Frankfurter Allgemeine Zeitung exclaiming that he is “miraculous”. In Japan, the music journal Ongaku no Tomo wrote that he has an “amazing sound”; in the United States, the Salt Lake City Deseret News “mesmerizing performance”. He is “one of the best in this orbit”, El Dia of Mexico, in Brasil Zero Hora “his Stradivarius turned into a Magic Violin”, in Israel “..even among the brilliant and promising, there is one outstanding” and “genius violinist” the Yedhiot Ahronot newspaper wrote after his performance with the Israel Philharmonic Orchestra.

Teaching 
Kameda held a teaching position at the Zurich University of the Arts between 2004 and 2009. In 2010 he was appointed at his present position as professor of violin at the University of Music Detmold.

Instrument 
Kameda has played on notable instruments such as David Tecchler 1715, Antonius Stradivari 1715 ex Joachim, most recently he plays the "Holroyd" Antonius Stradivari of 1727.

Ensemble 
In 2006, Kameda founded The Tokyo Chamber Philharmonic. A project orchestra based in the metropolitan area of Tokyo. In the same year, Kameda lead the orchestra on its first tour of Japan, conducting, as well as soloing with the newly founded orchestra; the first program was "The 8 seasons" a combined performance of the Four Seasons by Antonio Vivaldi and the Estaciones Porteñas from Astor Piazzolla arranged by pianist and composer Peter von Wienhardt.

Kameda was also the founding member of the piano trio Trio Frankfurt with pianist Nami Ejiri and cellist Isang Enders.

Partial list of Concert Halls 
Berliner Philharmonie
Konzerthaus Berlin
Festspielhaus Baden-Baden
Alte Oper Frankfurt
Konzerthaus Dortmund
Sala São Paulo
Wigmore Hall, London
Carnegie Hall, New York
Suntory Hall, Tokyo
Symphony Hall, Osaka
Orchard Hall, Tokyo
Tokyo Metropolitan Art Space
Sala Cecilia Mireiles, Rio de Janeiro
Palacio de Bellas Artes, Mexico City
Sala Nezahualcóyotl, Mexico City
Merkin Hall Kaufmann Center, New York City
92Y Hall, New York City
Musikvereinssaal Wien
Palau de la Musica, Valencia
Auditoria Nacional, Madrid
Teatro Teresa Carreño, Caracas
Sala de Giganti, Padova
Athens Concert Hall Megaron, Athen
National Concert Hall Dublin, Ireland

Partial discography 
Romances, kameda-music, King Record
The World of Koh Gabriel Kameda, BMG Funhouse
 Soundtrack NHK Special: Einstein Roman
Lutoslawski dirigiert Lutoslawski, Antes Edition

Filmography 
The Extraordinary Life & Music of Sonia Eckhardt-Gramatté
NHK Special: Einstein Roman

References

External links
Official Website
Facebook Artist Page
Soundcloud Page
Vimeo Page

German classical violinists
Male classical violinists
German people of Japanese descent
German male violinists
Child classical musicians
Manhattan School of Music alumni
Living people
Musicians from Freiburg im Breisgau
1975 births
Eurovision Young Musicians Finalists
Hochschule für Musik Karlsruhe alumni
Academic staff of the Hochschule für Musik Detmold
21st-century classical violinists
21st-century German male musicians